Pilodeudorix otraeda, the original round-spot, is a butterfly in the family Lycaenidae. It is found in Guinea, Sierra Leone, Ivory Coast, Ghana, Nigeria, Cameroon, Gabon, the Republic of the Congo, the Central African Republic, the Democratic Republic of the Congo, Uganda, Tanzania and Zambia. The habitat consists of primary forests.

Subspecies
Pilodeudorix otraeda otraeda (Guinea, Sierra Leone, Ivory Coast, Ghana)
Pilodeudorix otraeda genuba (Hewitson, 1875) (southern Nigeria, Cameroon, Gabon, Congo, Central African Republic, Democratic Republic of the Congo, western Uganda, western Tanzania, north-western Zambia)

References

External links
Die Gross-Schmetterlinge der Erde 13: Die Afrikanischen Tagfalter. Plate XIII 66 a

Butterflies described in 1863
Deudorigini
Butterflies of Africa
Taxa named by William Chapman Hewitson